Lebanon competed at the 1960 Summer Olympics in Rome, Italy.  The nation returned to the Olympic Games after boycotting the 1956 Summer Olympics because of British and French involvement in the Suez Crisis. 19 competitors, all men, took part in 15 events in 6 sports.

Athletics

Fencing

Four fencers, represented Lebanon in 1960.

Men's épée
 Ibrahim Osman
 Michel Saykali
 Mohamed Ramadan

Men's team épée
 Ibrahim Osman, Mohamed Ramadan, Michel Saykali, Hassan El-Said

Sailing

Shooting

Three shooters represented Lebanon in 1960.

50 m rifle, prone
 Abdullah Jaroudi, Jr.

Trap
 Elias Salhab
 Maurice Tabet

Weightlifting

Wrestling
Nazem Amine

References

External links
Official Olympic Reports

Nations at the 1960 Summer Olympics
1960
1960 in Lebanese sport